Sheena Lawrick (born June 22, 1983) is a Canadian softball infielder. Born in Calgary, Alberta, Lawrick was a Division I NCAA student athlete at the University of Nebraska from 2002 - 2005. She was a part of the Canadian National Softball team who finished fifth at the 2004 Summer Olympics and fourth at the 2008 Summer Olympics.

Notable International Softball accomplishments:

2014 Induction to Softball Alberta Hall of Fame

2012 World Softball Championships- Tournament Leader in Hits (11) .500 avg

2012 Named to the TFS All-World Softball team

2010 World Softball Championships- Bronze medal

2010 World Softball Championships- 2nd top hitter (.611 avg)

2008 Olympic Games- Beijing, China- 4th place - Softball

2004 Olympic Games- Athens, Greece- 5th place - Softball

Lawrick currently lives in Chicago, Illinois. She is a nutrition consultant and principal with Beyond the Box Nutrition and a competitive Crossfit athlete.

1983 births
Living people
Olympic softball players of Canada
Softball players at the 2004 Summer Olympics
Softball players at the 2008 Summer Olympics
Nebraska Cornhuskers softball players
Sportspeople from Calgary
Canadian softball players